The Tasmanian Government Railways E+ class was a class of 4-6-0T steam locomotives operated by the Tasmanian Main Line Company and later the Tasmanian Government Railways.

History
In 1874, the Tasmanian Main Line Company took delivery of seven 4-6-0 tank locomotives from the Hunslet Engine Company, Leeds. Problems soon arose with their weight and the side tanks were removed with their water supply carried in a tank in an open wagon that was towed. In 1887, one was sold to the contractor building the Devonport to Ulverstone line and in 1889 another to the builder of the Strahan to Zeehan line.

The remaining five were included in the sale of the Tasmanian Main Line Company to the Tasmanian Government Railways on 1 October 1890 and classified as the E+ class (the + denoting ex-TMLR stock). Most were converted to 4-4-0 configuration by removing the leading driving axle. The locomotive sold to the Zeehan line contractor was purchased in 1897. From 1907, some were transferred to the Public Works Department. All had been scrapped by 1929.

References

External links
 https://stors.tas.gov.au/P2316-1-23$init=P2316-1-23_003
 https://www.flickr.com/photos/29903115@N06/46685322744/

Hunslet locomotives
Railway locomotives introduced in 1874
Steam locomotives of Tasmania
3 ft 6 in gauge locomotives of Australia
4-6-0T locomotives